Le Maine libre is a French daily newspaper from Sarthe created in 1944. It is published seven days a week, and has three different geographical editions. It is headquartered in Le Mans.

Le Maine libre is part of the newspaper conglomerate "Les journaux de la Loire", owned by the group Ouest-France SIPA. An online edition is available.

Direction 
 CEO: Matthieu Fuchs
 Chief editor: Jérôme Glaize

Circulation

External links
 Official website
 Circulation (OJD)

1944 establishments in France
Daily newspapers published in France
Mass media in Le Mans
Publications established in 1944